Alvvays is the debut studio album by Canadian indie pop band Alvvays, released on July 22, 2014, by Polyvinyl, Royal Mountain and Transgressive.

The album was shortlisted for the 2015 Polaris Music Prize.

Accolades

Track listing

Personnel
Molly Rankin – vocals, guitar
Alec O'Hanley – guitar, vocals, keyboards, drum machine
Kerri MacLellen – keyboards, vocals
Brian Murphy – bass
Eric Hamelin – drums (2, 3, 5, 6)
Chris Dadge – drums (1, 4, 8)
Chad VanGaalen – programming, tambourine, bongos

Production
Chad VanGaalen – engineering and production
Graham Walsh – tracking (additional)
Jeff McMurrich – tracking (additional)
John Agnello – mixing
Ian McGettigan – mixing (additional)
Alec O'Hanley – mixing (additional)
Greg Calbi – mastering 
Steve Fallone – mastering

Charts

References

2014 debut albums
Alvvays albums
Polyvinyl Record Co. albums
Transgressive Records albums
Royal Mountain Records albums